Koanga is a town in the Bingo Department of Boulkiemdé Province in central western Burkina Faso. In 2005, it had a population of 1,393.

References

Populated places in Boulkiemdé Province